"It's Over" is a song by Squeeze, released as their fifth and final single from their tenth album, Some Fantastic Place.

Track listing

7" vinyl and cassette
 "It's Over" (3:45)
 "Is That Love (live)" (2:45)

CD
 "It's Over" (3:45)
 "Is That Love (live)" (2:45)
 "Pulling Mussels (From the Shell) (live)" (3:55)
 "Goodbye Girl (live)" (5:24)

External links
Squeeze discography at Squeezenet

Squeeze (band) songs
1994 singles
Songs written by Glenn Tilbrook
Songs written by Chris Difford
1993 songs